Motu Paahi ("small island") is an islet in the coral reef surrounding Bora Bora, in French Polynesia.

Islands of the Society Islands